The Politburo of the Chinese Communist Party, formally known as the Political Bureau of the Central Committee of the Communist Party of China, is the decision-making body of the Central Committee of the Chinese Communist Party.

Currently, the bureau is a group of 24 top officials who oversee the party and central government. The politburo is headed by a general secretary. Unlike politburos of other communist parties, power within the CCP Politburo is further centralized in the Politburo Standing Committee, a group of 7 individuals from among the larger Politburo.

The Politburo is nominally elected by the Central Committee. In practice, however, scholars of Chinese elite politics believe that the Politburo is a self-perpetuating body, with new members of both the Politburo and its Standing Committee chosen through a series of deliberations by current Politburo members and retired Politburo Standing Committee members. The current and former Politburo members conduct a series of informal straw polls to determine the group's level of support for each new candidate's membership in the Politburo. The process for selecting the new Politburo begins with a closed door meeting by the incumbent Politburo Standing Committee in Beidaihe in the summer before the National Congress of the CCP convenes.

The power of the Politburo resides largely in the fact that its members generally simultaneously hold positions within the People's Republic of China state positions and with the control over personnel appointments that the Politburo and Secretariat have. In addition, some Politburo members hold powerful regional positions. How the Politburo works internally is unclear, but it appears that the full Politburo meets once a month and the standing committee meets weekly. This is believed to be much more infrequent than the former Soviet Politburo had met. The agenda for the meetings is controlled by the CCP general secretary and decisions are made by consensus rather than by majority vote.

The Politburo was eclipsed by the Secretariat of the Chinese Communist Party in the early 1980s under Hu Yaobang, but has re-emerged as a dominant force after Hu's ousting in 1987.

Composition and selection 
Since the 1990s, Politburo members concurrently held posts in the party apparatus, in state posts, and as regional party chiefs. In addition, members serving in the military and security sectors have been limited to 3 posts; in contrast, most members in the 1980s had a military command background. In 2017, for the 19th Central Committee Politburo, aside from the heads of the four main institutional hierarchies—the CCP, the National People's Congress, the State Council and the Chinese People's Political Consultative Conference, there were six members each holding posts in the party, the national government, the regional governments, and three in the military. The average age of the 2017 Politburo's members was 62, which was similar to those in recent decades. Before that, the Party under Deng Xiaoping deliberately encouraged turnover by imposing term limits and retirement ages.

In October 2017, at the First Plenary Session of the 19th CCP Central Committee, it was decided that all Politburo members shall make an annual written presentation to the Central Committee and the General Secretary. In March 2018, all Standing Committee members and members of the Politburo made their first written presentation to the Central Committee and General Secretary Xi Jinping.

Since the 17th National Congress, the official way of electing the Politburo was through a process called "democratic recommendation" where the CCP conducted a straw poll of 200 candidates to the Politburo, which were factored into the final list of candidates presented at the National Congress of the CCP. However, this was abolished in the 19th National Congress under Xi, which denounced the "vote buying" and the "voting based on personal connections and favors" of this method, particularly in connection to politicians who fell after the anti-corruption campaign under Xi. The process was officially replaced with a method of "face-to-face interviews, investigation and study".

Activities 
The Politburo and the Politburo Standing Committee are the top decision-making institutions for the CCP Central Committee.

The Politburo holds regular study sessions which serve as an opportunity for CCP leadership to promote new policies. Since 2002, these sessions have been widely publicized. Frequently, they address foreign affairs.

Current Politburo 

The 20th Politburo was elected at the first plenary session of the 20th Central Committee in October 2022.

See also 

 Collective leadership
 Surname stroke order
 Central Committee of the Chinese Communist Party
 Politburo Standing Committee of the Chinese Communist Party
 General Secretary 
 Central Secretariat
 General Office
 Central Security Bureau
 Central Guard Unit

References